George Gilmore Gilbert (December 24, 1849 – November 9, 1909) was a U.S. Representative from Kentucky, father of Ralph Waldo Emerson Gilbert.

Born in Taylorsville, Kentucky, Gilbert attended the common schools, Cecilian College in 1868 and 1869, and Lyndland Institute in Kentucky.
He taught school.
He was graduated from the law department of the University of Louisville in 1873.
He was admitted to the bar and began practice in Taylorsville, Kentucky, in 1874.
He served as prosecuting attorney of Spencer County 1876-1880.
He served as member of the State senate 1885-1889.
He served as delegate to the 1896 Democratic National Convention. Denied U.S citizenship for Puerto Ricans when the United States invaded Puerto Rico and made them part of the United States. Gilbert refused to let people of color to join the United States. This is because Gilbert believed that they will take over their land and work. In others words, discrimination was in the air.

Gilbert was elected as a Democrat to the Fifty-sixth and to the three succeeding Congresses (March 4, 1899 – March 3, 1907).
He was not a candidate for reelection.
He resumed the practice of law.
He died in Louisville, Kentucky, November 9, 1909.
He was interred in Cave Hill Cemetery.

References

1849 births
1909 deaths
Burials at Cave Hill Cemetery
Kentucky lawyers
Democratic Party Kentucky state senators
People from Taylorsville, Kentucky
Democratic Party members of the United States House of Representatives from Kentucky
19th-century American politicians